Chanda Rubin (born February 18, 1976) is an American former top-10 professional tennis player. During her career, she reached the semifinals at the 1996 Australian Open, the quarterfinals of the French Open three times, and had wins over world-number-ones Serena Williams and Martina Hingis. In doubles, she won the 1996 Australian Open with Arantxa Sánchez Vicario and was runner-up at the 1999 US Open with Sandrine Testud.

Early life and family
Rubin was born to Edward D. Rubin, a state judge in Louisiana, and Bernadette Fontenot Rubin. She was the middle child of three siblings. As a child, she was taught the sport of tennis by Nehemiah Atkinson.

She married Mireyou Hollier in April 2015 and their daughter was born in October 2016.

In early 2016, her younger brother, Edward Rubin Jr., died aged 38 at his home in Lafayette, Louisiana.

Tennis career
In 1992, Rubin won the girls' singles title at Wimbledon, and reached a peak ranking of world No. 2 in the ITF Junior rankings.

Her breakthrough season on the professional tour was 1995. In the third round of the French Open, Rubin came from 0–5, 0–40 down in the third set against Jana Novotná, saving nine match points, before winning 8–6. In the second round of Wimbledon, Rubin defeated Patricia Hy-Boulais 7–6, 6–7, 17–15, the longest women's match in Wimbledon history. At the LA Tennis Championships in August, she defeated Gabriela Sabatini and world No. 2, Arantxa Sanchez Vicario, on her way to the final.

In 1996, Rubin reached the Australian Open semifinals, defeating Gabriela Sabatini in the fourth round and then Sánchez Vicario 6–4, 2–6, 16–14 in the quarterfinals. The 48 games played in their quarterfinal are the most for a women's match at the Australian Open (tied in 2018). Rubin lost in the semifinals to Monica Seles 6–7, 6–1, 7–5, despite holding a 5–2 lead in the third set. Rubin rose to a career-high ranking of No. 6, after reaching the final of the Miami Open in 1996 where she lost to Steffi Graf. However, after fracturing a bone in her right hand in Miami, Rubin underwent surgery and missed the majority of the rest of the season.

Representing the U.S., Rubin won the Hopman Cup alongside Justin Gimelstob. She remained undefeated through three ties and the final in her singles matches. At the Linz Open, Rubin defeated world No. 4, Jana Novotna, on the way to her first singles title.

In Indian Wells in 1999, Rubin defeated both Amanda Coetzer and world No. 1, Martina Hingis, in straight sets on her way to the semifinals. She also won her second career title at the Hobart International.

Rubin underwent arthroscopic surgery on her left knee in 2001 after the Australian Open, and then suffered a left Achilles tendon injury in April, thereby missing the majority of the season.

In 2002, Rubin underwent surgery on her left knee again, missing the first half of the season. In August, she defeated Lindsay Davenport, Jelena Dokic and the world No. 1, Serena Williams, on her way to the title in Los Angeles. Her upset of Williams ended the top-ranked player's winning streak of 21 matches, a stretch that had carried Williams through titles at the French Open and Wimbledon.

At the Miami Open in 2003, Rubin beat both Amélie Mauresmo and Justine Henin in straight sets on her way to the semifinals, after which she peaked again at No. 6 in the rankings. She reached her third and final French Open quarterfinal, and also won the Eastbourne International title for a second time, defeating Jennifer Capriati in the semifinals and Conchita Martinez in the final. It would be Rubin's last career title.

Rubin missed the majority of the 2004–2006 seasons due to the persistent knee injury. Her last professional match was in October 2006 in Quebec City.

She was inducted into the Southern Tennis Hall of Fame in 2009, and the Louisiana Sports Hall of Fame in 2013.

Post-retirement
In 2013, Rubin completed a four-year Bachelor of Liberal Arts in Extension Studies with a concentration in Economics at Harvard Extension School, graduating cum laude.

In recent years, she has developed a career in broadcasting, working for Tennis Channel as a presenter and commentator.

Awards
 1995: ATA Athlete of the Year
 1995: TENNIS Magazine Most Improved Player of the Year
 1995: US Tennis Association Female Athlete of the Year
 1995: WTA Most Improved Player of the Year
 1997: Arthur Ashe Leadership Award
 2002: Family Circle Player Who Makes a Difference Award
 2003: USTA Service Bowl Award
 2008: International Lawn Tennis Danzig Trophy

Grand Slam finals

Doubles: 2 (1 title, 1 runner-up)

WTA career finals

Singles: 19 (7 titles, 12 runner-ups)

Doubles: 17 (10 titles, 7 runner-ups)

Singles performance timeline

Wins over top 10 players

References

External links

 
 
 

1976 births
Living people
African-American female tennis players
American female tennis players
Australian Open (tennis) champions
Hopman Cup competitors
Olympic tennis players of the United States
Sportspeople from Lafayette, Louisiana
Tennis people from Louisiana
Tennis players at the 1995 Pan American Games
Tennis players at the 2004 Summer Olympics
Wimbledon junior champions
Grand Slam (tennis) champions in women's doubles
Grand Slam (tennis) champions in girls' singles
Tennis commentators
Pan American Games medalists in tennis
Pan American Games silver medalists for the United States
Pan American Games bronze medalists for the United States
Harvard Extension School alumni
Medalists at the 1995 Pan American Games
21st-century African-American sportspeople
21st-century African-American women
20th-century African-American sportspeople
20th-century African-American women
20th-century African-American people